In competitive beach soccer, the world cup is the sport's paramount competition. It is contested by senior men's national teams. 

To date, two iterations of a world cup in beach soccer have existed. The first was the Beach Soccer World Championships which ran annually from 1995 to 2004. FIFA then became the governing body of the sport. As a result, the World Championships were abolished and replaced by the second and current iteration, the FIFA Beach Soccer World Cup, which began in 2005 and was also held annually; since 2009, it has been a biennial event. Whilst being two independently governed competitions, both have occurred to determine the same outcome: the world champions in beach soccer.

Four nations have been crowned world champions of the 21 editions to date. By far the most successful team is Brazil who have historically dominated the title, winning 14; they and Portugal are the only two nations to win in both eras of the sport's world cup. The current champions are Russia, who won the 2021 competition The other victors are France.

The following lists a summary of the results of each world cup and associated statistics; the latter combines the data of all the editions of both iterations.

List of world cups
The numbers in parentheses indicate the total number of world titles won by that team as of that victory.

Beach Soccer World Championships (1995–2004)

FIFA Beach Soccer World Cup (2005–present)

Statistics

Successful nations
The following lists the teams that have finished in the top four.

Overall, 19 nations have made at least one top four finish. Of those 19 nations, only seven have made a top four finish in both iterations of the competition. Brazil remained the only nation to finish in the final four of every championship until 2015 when they finished in fifth place. 

* = Hosts

Success by region

Appearances and performance

The following lists the teams who have appeared in at least one tournament, in order from the most appearances down to the least, and that nation's best performance.

As of the 2021 edition, 47 countries have participated over the 21 tournaments. However, only one country has participated in all the events which is Brazil. European teams have dominated in appearances by continent, since 15 of the 47 countries have been from Europe, double than that of any other.

Only eight countries who appeared in an edition of the World Championships have failed to reappear in a FIFA World Cup. Peru (5) have appeared in the most events without any one of those being under FIFA's control. Senegal (8) have appeared in the most FIFA tournaments without having ever once appeared in the World Championships.

Notes

References

External links
FIFA Beach Soccer World Cup, at FIFA.com
FIFA Beach Soccer World Cup, at Beach Soccer Worldwide
Beach Soccer World Cup - Overview, at RSSSF

 
 
Beach soccer
Recurring sporting events established in 1995